RSME may refer to:

Religious spiritual mystical experience
Root mean square deviation, also known as Root-mean-square-error
Royal School of Military Engineering
16S rRNA (uracil1498-N3)-methyltransferase, an enzyme
Royal Spanish Mathematical Society (Real Sociedad Matemática Española)